The 1924 National Championship (Serbo-Croato-Slovenian: Državno prvenstvo 1924. / Државно првенство 1924.) held in the Kingdom of Serbs, Croats and Slovenes was the second nationwide domestic football competition. At this point there was no league championship in the modern sense as the competition was held in a single-legged cup format, with participating clubs qualifying via regional playoffs organised by regional football subfederations.

Qualified clubs

Somborski SK (Subotica Football Subfederation)
Građanski Zagreb (Zagreb Football Subfederation)
Slavija Osijek (Osijek Football Subfederation)
Hajduk Split (Split Football Subfederation)
Ilirija Ljubljana (Ljubljana Football Subfederation)
SK Jugoslavija Belgrade (Belgrade Football Subfederation)
SAŠK Sarajevo (Sarajevo Football Subfederation)

Tournament

Quarter finals

|-
|colspan="5" style="background-color:#D0D0D0" align=center|7/8 September 1924
||colspan="2" rowspan="2" 

||colspan="2" 
|}

Semi finals

|-
|colspan="3" style="background-color:#D0D0D0" align=center|21 September 1924

|}

Finals

|-
|colspan="3" style="background-color:#D0D0D0" align=center|12 October 1924

|}
Note: The match was played in Zagreb.

Winning squad
Champions:

SK JUGOSLAVIJA (coach:  Karel Bláha)
Nationality, name, (caps/goals)
 Károly Nemes (3/0)
 Milutin Ivković (3/0)
 Branko Petrović (2/0)
 Mihailo Načević (3/0)
 Boško Todorić (1/0)
 Sveta Marković (3/0)
 Alois Machek (3/0)
 Damjan Đurić (3/1)
 Dragan Jovanović (3/4)
 Stevan Luburić (3/3)
 Dušan Petković (3/4)
 Branislav Sekulić (3/0)

Top scorers
Final goalscoring position, number of goals, player/players and club.
1 - 6 goals - Dragan Jovanović (Jugoslavija)
2 - 3 goals - Stevan Luburić (Jugoslavija), Antun Bonačić, Ljubo Benčić, Vinko Radić (all Hajduk Split)

See also
Yugoslav Cup
Yugoslav League Championship
Football Association of Yugoslavia

References

External links
Yugoslavia Domestic Football Full Tables
Serbian Digital Library (Newspaper Politika: Archive (1904-1941)

1
Yugoslav Football Championship